Owilfordia is a genus of worms belonging to the family Plagiorhynchidae.

Species:

Owilfordia olseni 
Owilfordia schmidti 
Owilfordia teliger

References

Plagiorhynchidae
Acanthocephala genera